Erin's Own Gaelic Athletic Club, Cargin is a sports club based in Toome, County Antrim, Northern Ireland. It competes in the Antrim leagues and championships of the Gaelic Athletic Association, in Gaelic football and camogie.

History
A club based in Toome, Lámh Dearg, won the 1923 Antrim Senior Football Championship. Erin's Own was founded in 1928, but the "1923" on the club crest refers to the earlier club. The club played the first "official" games of rounders in Ireland in June 1958.

Honours

Antrim Senior Football Championship (11)
1974, 1995, 1999, 2000, 2006, 2015, 2016, 2018, 2019, 2020, 2022
Antrim Intermediate Football Championship (2)
2001, 2002
Antrim Junior Football Championship (2)
1953, 1991
Antrim Under-21 Football Championship (3)
2006, 2008, 2010
Antrim Minor Football Championship (5)
1975, 1991, 2000, 2019, 2020
Antrim Reserve Football Championship (9)
1998, 2005, 2007,2008, 2009, 2010, 2011, 2016, 2017
Antrim Junior Hurling Championship (1)
1937
 South West Antrim U-14 League (1)
1999, 2002, 2019
 South West Antrim U-16 League (2)
2002, 2016
 South West Antrim U-16 Shield (2)
 2004, 2005
 All Ireland Senior Mens Rounders (4)
1977, 1987, 1988, 1989
 South West Antrim U-14 Feile (2)
2018, 2019

References

External links
Official site

Gaelic games clubs in County Antrim
Camogie clubs in County Antrim
Hurling clubs in County Antrim
Gaelic football clubs in County Antrim